The 1946 Rocky Mountain Conference football season was the season of college football played by the five member schools of the Rocky Mountain Conference (RMC) as part of the 1946 college football season.

The Montana State Bobcats won the RMC championship with a 5–3–2 record (2–0–1 against conference opponents) and outscored opponents by a total of 198 to 156.

Conference overview

Teams

Montana State

The 1946 Montana State Bobcats football team represented Montana State College (now known as Montana State University) of Bozeman, Montana. In their first season under head coach Clyde Carpenter, the Bobcats compiled a 5–3–2 record (2–0–1 against RMC opponents), won the RMC championship, and outscored opponents by a total of 198 to 156.

Players receiving all-conference honors were end Mike McCormick, tackle Len Larson, guard Dick Ball, and backs Bill Nelson and Neil Brooks. Tackle John McLellan was selected by the Chicago Bearsin the 19th round (175th pick) of the 1947 NFL Draft.

Colorado State–Greeley

The 1946 Colorado State–Greeley Bears football team represented Colorado State College at Greeley, Colorado (now known as the University of Northern Colorado). In their 13th season under head coach John W. Hancock, the Bears compiled a 6–3 record (3–1 against RMC opponents), finished in second place in the RMC, and outscored opponents by a total of 218 to 101.

Western State

The 1946 Western State Mountaineers football team represented Western State College of Colorado at Gunnison, Colorado (now known as the Western Colorado University). Led by head coach Paul W. Wright, the Bears compiled a 5–4–1 record (1–1 against RMC opponents), finished in third place in the RMC, and outscored opponents by a total of 142 to 96.

The 1946 season was the first for the Western State football program since  1941. The sport was abandoned after the 1941 season due to  World  War II.

Colorado College

The 1946 Colorado College Tigers football team represented Colorado College of Colorado Springs, Colorado. Led by head coach Harold A. White, the Tigers compiled a 4–4–1 record (0–1–1 against RMC opponents), finished in fourth place in the RMC, and outscored opponents by a total of 131 to 106.

Colorado Mines

The 1946 Colorado Mines Orediggers football team represented the Colorado School of Mines of Golden, Colorado. In their eighth year under head coach John Mason, the Orediggers compiled a 1–4–1 record (0–3 against RMC opponents), finished in last place in the RMC, and were outscored by a total of 132 to 62.

References